Lifter (2001) is the second album for the Dallas, Texas-based band Edgewater. The album was recorded independently, and some of its tracks were included on their first release, as well as their Wind-up debut, South of Sideways.

Track listing
All tracks written by Matt Moseman, Micah Creel, Justin Middleton, Cameron Woolf, and Jeremy "Worm" Rees, except for "I Won't Back Down".
 "Sweet Suffocation" – 3:17
 "Eyes Wired Shut" – 3:14
 "Break Me Out" – 3:56
 "Neglected" – 4:05
 "Tres Quatros" – 3:44
 "Ode To You" – 4:00
 "One Perfect Something" – 3:32
 "Echo" – 3:33
 "I Won't Back Down" – 2:58 (Tom Petty, Jeff Lynne)
 "Lifter" – 4:58

Personnel
 Matt Moseman - vocals
 Micah Creel - guitar
 Justin Middleton - guitar
 Cameron Woolf - bass
 Jeremy "Worm" Rees - drums

External links
 Official Site
 Edgewater on MySpace

Edgewater (band) albums
2001 albums